The 1050s was a decade of the Julian Calendar which began on January 1, 1050, and ended on December 31, 1059.

Significant people
 Godwin, Earl of Wessex
 Al-Qa'im
 Tughril

References